Transference is the seventh studio album by the American indie rock band Spoon. It was released on January 18, 2010, in Europe, and on January 19 in North America. In Australia, it was released by Spunk Records on January 15.

The album debuted at number 4 on the Billboard 200 chart, selling 53,000 copies in its first week. As of June 2013, it had sold 183,000 copies in United States.

The cover image is an untitled 1970 photograph by the American photographer William Eggleston.

Reception

Exclaim! placed Transference at number 9 on their list of the Best Pop & Rock Albums of 2010, with Ben Conoley writing: "With Transference, Spoon took a more minimalist approach than predecessors Ga Ga Ga Ga Ga and Gimme Fiction, demonstrating that great rock music doesn't need more than confidence, swagger and good hooks." Rolling Stone ranked it number 22 on their list of the 30 Best Albums of 2010, and Paste Magazine (#36), Spin Magazine (#31), The A.V. Club (#25), PopMatters (#25), and Uncut Magazine (#22) also included it on their year-end lists of the best albums of 2010.

Track listing

Notes
 "The Mystery Zone" has a track length of 5:50 on the LP edition of the album.

Personnel
Spoon
Britt Daniel
Jim Eno
Eric Harvey
Rob Pope

Charts

References

2010 albums
Spoon (band) albums
Anti- (record label) albums
Merge Records albums